Piruz (پيروز) is a Persian male given name that comes from Middle Persian:  (pērōz, pyrwz) meaning "victorious".

Piruz may refer to:

Historical figures
 Peroz I or Piruz I, Sasanian king
 Peroz II or Piruz II, Sasanian king
 Peroz III son of King Yazdegerd III the last king of Persia
 Piruz, or Abu Lu'lu'a Firuz, Persian slave who killed the second Islamic caliph Umar
 Piruz Khosrow, Persian aristocrat who murdered Queen Boran
 Khosrau II or Khosro Parviz, Sasanian emperor

Places
 Piruz, Iran, a village in Hamadan
 Piruzeh, a village in Kermanshah Province
 Piruzabad, Kerman
 Piruzabad, Khuzestan
 Piruzabad, Golestan

Notable people with the name
Piruz Dilanchi, Azerbaijani activist

Myths and legends
Hajji Firuz or Khwaja Piruz, a legendary figure in Iranian folklore

See also
 Feroz or Firuz (disambiguation)
 Parviz (disambiguation)